Robin Byrd (born April 6, 1957) is an American former pornographic actress and the host of The Robin Byrd Show, which has appeared on leased access cable television in New York City since 1977.

Background

Robin Byrd was born and raised in New York City, New York. A child of adoption, she has never been able to identify her birth parents, due to the unwillingness of her adoptive mother to reveal that information and sealed birth and adoption records under New York state law.

At the time of filming the porn film Debbie Does Dallas, Byrd was living in New York City and was still known as Robin Cohen. After taking college classes in marketing and advertising at Baruch College and dropping out as a senior, she attended the School of Visual Arts and worked as a nude model for art classes. She subsequently starred in porn films during the late 1970s, including a role in the previously mentioned Debbie Does Dallas.

Public access 
After guest-hosting on a leased access show called Hot Legs, Byrd changed the name to The Robin Byrd Show in 1977. The show has aired continuously since then, though it now shows reruns rather than live episodes. Each episode features Byrd in her trademark black crochet bikini and white fingernail polish, on an all-red set with a large, heart-shaped neon sign that bears the name of her show. Male and female porn stars and strippers appear as guests and perform fully nude stripteases, sometimes also taking calls from viewers. Byrd and her guests also frequently engage in onscreen sexplay by the end of the episode. Each show customarily ends with all the guests dancing to Robin's recording of a bawdy novelty tune, "Baby, Let Me Bang Your Box".

Time Warner legal issues 
Byrd and Al Goldstein were in a long-standing legal battle with Time Warner Cable (and its predecessor, Manhattan Cable), which wanted to scramble all adult-oriented content so that subscribers had to send in written requests to view it. In 1978, the Eighth Circuit Court of Appeals struck as unconstitutional the Federal Communications Commission (FCC) mandatory access regulations under which Byrd and Goldstein had challenged the cable provider's actions, but the U.S. Supreme Court disposed of the case on other grounds.

In 1995, the issue was again before the United States Court of Appeals for the District of Columbia Circuit, which upheld the regulations and ruled that Time Warner's requirement for written requests was a violation. , The Robin Byrd Show continues to be aired unscrambled and uncut although with disclaimers that the content is not for children to watch.

In popular culture 
Byrd's show and filmography have made her a local celebrity and to some extent, a national one. She is a frequent presenter at New York City adult entertainment, gay pride, and AIDS awareness events. The Robin Byrd Show was parodied on Saturday Night Live in a series of skits airing in 1997 and 1998; Byrd was played by Cheri Oteri.

In 1999, Richard Avedon photographed Byrd for a feature in The New Yorker on famous and influential New Yorkers. Byrd has also branched out into other adult-oriented businesses, including phone sex lines and ringtones.

In 2015, Robin released "Touch Me", a dance single with recording artist Lovari.

Byrd has stated that she is bisexual.

References

External links
 
 
 
 
 "Real and Live, but Maybe Not Nude" - NY Times article
 "Robin Byrd Brings THE ROBIN BYRD SHOW LIVE! to The Cutting Room, Beg. 12/1" article

1957 births
Living people
American adoptees
American entertainment industry businesspeople
American pornographic film actresses
Baruch College alumni
Bisexual pornographic film actresses
American television talk show hosts
LGBT people from New York (state)
Actresses from New York City
American LGBT actors
School of Visual Arts alumni
Pornographic film actors from New York (state)
American public access television personalities
21st-century American women